Sir Edward James Reed, KCB, FRS (20 September 1830 – 30 November 1906) was a British naval architect, author, politician, and railroad magnate. He was the Chief Constructor of the Royal Navy from 1863 until 1870. He was a Liberal politician who sat in the House of Commons from 1874 to 1906.

Early life
Edward Reed was born in Sheerness, Kent and was the son of John and Elizabeth Reed. He was a naval apprentice at Sheerness and subsequently entered the School of Mathematics and Naval Construction at Portsmouth. In 1851 he married Rosetta, the sister of Nathaniel Barnaby. Barnaby was at that time a fellow student; he would subsequently succeed Reed as Chief Constructor. In 1852 he entered employment at Sheerness Dockyard, but resigned after a disagreement with the management. He then worked in journalism, including editing the Mechanics' Magazine. In 1860, Reed was appointed secretary of the newly formed Institute of Naval Architects.

Naval architect
In 1863, at the early age of 33, succeeded Isaac Watts as Chief Constructor. His term of office saw the final transition from wooden to ironclad warships. Notable warships constructed under his direction included: 
HMS Bellerophon using an innovative "bracket frame" system of construction in 1865.
The ocean-going turret-ship HMS Monarch in 1868.
The mastless turret ship HMS Devastation in 1871.

His tenure was marred by intense controversy with the naval officer, MP and inventor Captain Cowper Phipps Coles. This culminated in the funding by Parliament of a new battleship, HMS Captain, to be built to Coles' requirement without reference to Reed's department and contrary to his advice. Embittered, Reed resigned in July 1870. "His departure was described as a national disaster by the Controller, Vice-Admiral Robert Spencer Robinson." The following September, the Captain foundered in a gale with the loss of nearly 500 lives, including Captain Coles.

He was a trenchant, though ultimately reactionary, critic of the policy of his successors as Chief Constructor. After leaving the Admiralty, he continued to design warships for the navies of other nations. These included Brazil, Germany, Chile and Japan. A number of these vessels were subsequently purchased by the Royal Navy.

Reed was appointed Companion of the Bath (CB) in 1868, during his term as Chief Constructor, and subsequently Knight Commander of the Bath (KCB) in 1880. He was elected Fellow of the Royal Society (FRS) in 1876. He was also a Knight Commander of the Imperial Russian Order of St Stanislus, a Knight of the Austrian Order of Franz Joseph, and of the Turkish Order of the Medjidie.

At Reed's suggestion, the Channel Tubular Railway Preliminary Company was founded in London in 1892, a company with a capital of £40,000, whose capital was to be raised through the issue of 250,000 Parts de Fondateurs. The company, led by Reed, planned the construction of a railway tunnel through the English Channel, which would allow travelers to reach their destination faster than would be possible with a boat crossing. The project failed due to political considerations.

Parliamentary career
At the 1874 general election Reed was elected as Liberal member of parliament for Pembroke.

Reed visited Japan in 1879 at the invitation of the Imperial Government. Ostensibly Reed was there to oversee the delivery of three new British built iron-clad warships, Fusō, Kongō, and Hiei for the Imperial Japanese Navy. Given the ostentatious entertainment provided by his Japanese hosts over a period of three months, there were also inevitable political considerations; Japan was actively seeking revision of unequal trade agreements and was eager to develop influence with prominent Liberal members of the House of Commons. On his return to London Reed wrote a sympathetic history of the country published to some success the following year.

At the next General Election in 1880 he was elected as member for Cardiff. In 1886, he was appointed Lord of the Treasury in Gladstone's third ministry.

Reed lost his parliamentary seat in 1895, but regained it in 1900. In 1905 he indicated that he would retire from parliament at the next election that occurred in 1906.

Florida railroad magnate
In 1881, Reed and several English and Dutch investors purchased the Atlantic, Gulf, and West India Transit Company, the 1872 reorganization of the Florida Railroad, which ran cross-state in Florida from Fernandina southwest to Cedar Key, and which operated two subsidiaries: the Peninsular Railroad, running to Ocala and Silver Springs from a junction with the Florida Railroad at Waldo; and the Tropical Florida Railroad, which ran from Ocala to Wildwood. Reed reorganized the three railroads as the Florida Transit Company, which he reorganized again as the Florida Transit and Peninsular Railroad in 1883.

In 1882, Reed acquired the Jacksonville, Pensacola and Mobile Railroad (JP&M), which ran from Quincy east through Tallahassee to Lake City, and its subsidiary, the Florida Central Railroad, which ran east from Lake City to Jacksonville. Reed reorganized both the JP&M and the Florida Central as the Florida Central and Western Railroad.

In 1884, Reed merged the Florida Central and Western with the Florida Transit and Peninsular and, in 1885, after signing lease agreements with two smaller Florida lines, brought all of these entities under the umbrella of one large firm, the Florida Railway and Navigation Company. Reed subsequently withdrew from active control and, in 1886, after a brief receivership, the corporation was reorganized as the Florida Central and Peninsular Railroad (FC&P). In 1900, a year after purchasing the majority of FC&P stock, the newly organized Seaboard Air Line Railway (now CSX Transportation) leased the FC&P and, in 1903, acquired it outright.

Death
Reed died from heart failure at his home in The Strand, London in November 1906. He was buried in Putney Vale Cemetery on 4 December. His son Edward Tennyson Reed became the political caricaturist of Punch magazine.

Works
Notable works include
Shipbuilding in Iron and Steel (1868)
Our Ironclad Ships, their Qualities, Performance and Cost (1869)
Japan: its History, Traditions, and Religions, with the Narrative of a Visit in 1879 Two volumes. London, J. Murray (1880)
Treatise on the stability of ships (1884)

References

Further reading
 Brown, DK (2003). Warrior to Dreadnought: Warship Development 1860–1905. Caxton Editions. .
 Archibald, EHH (1984). The Fighting Ship in the Royal Navy 1897–1984. Blandford. .
 Sandler, Stanley,  "The Emergence of the Modern Capital Ship".  Newark, DE:  University of Delaware Press/Associated University Presses.  1979.
 Turner, Gregg M. (2008) A Journey into Florida Railroad History. Gainesville, Florida: University Press of Florida. .

External links

 
 
 Royal Society of London on-line biography
Reed Obituary
A Treatise on the Stability of Ships written by Edward Reed in 1885

1830 births
1906 deaths
Burials at Putney Vale Cemetery
English engineers
People from Sheerness
Royal Navy
British naval architects
Fellows of the Royal Society
Liberal Party (UK) MPs for Welsh constituencies
Members of the Parliament of the United Kingdom for Cardiff constituencies
Knights Commander of the Order of the Bath
UK MPs 1874–1880
UK MPs 1880–1885
UK MPs 1885–1886
UK MPs 1886–1892
UK MPs 1892–1895
UK MPs 1900–1906
Members of the Parliament of the United Kingdom for Pembrokeshire constituencies
19th-century British businesspeople